Rev. Fr. Duraiswami Simon Amalorpavadass (15 June 1932 – 25 May 1990) was a Catholic South-Indian theologian who played a vital role in the renewal of life and mission of the Roman Catholic Church in India, particularly after Vatican II.  He was fluent in Tamil, French and English. He was the younger brother of Cardinal Lourdusamy.

Rev. Stephen Bevans, S.V.D., in a paper presented to celebrate 30 years of Evangelii nuntiandi, writes that Amalorpavadass, one of the two special secretaries on the 1974 Synod of Bishops ("Evangelization in the Modern World"), convened by Pope Paul VI, "attempted to propose an interpretation that took into account many of the important movements in Asia and other parts of the Third World. His ideas revolved around a greater role for the local church and the emergence of the theology of liberation".

Amalorpavadass was a member of the Ecumenical Association of Third World Theologians (EATWOT).

Early years
Amalorpavadass was born in Kallery, a village in the Viluppuram district of Tamil Nadu, on 15 June 1932.

He had been a student of St Anne's High School, Tindivanam and St. Joseph's Higher Secondary School, Cuddalore.

Seminary studies and ordination
Amalorpavadass studied at the St Agnes Minor Seminary in Cuddalore and later graduated from St Joseph's College in Tiruchirapalli

In 1953 Amalorpavadass joined St. Peter's Pontifical Seminary in Malleswaram, Bangalore.

After his completion of theological studies in Bangalore he was ordained on 12 April 1959 as a priest of the Archdiocese of Pondicherry and Cuddalore.

He served in the parishes of the Archdiocese before being appointed to The Regional Catechetical Centre of the archdiocese to animate and coordinate the work of the centre for the South Indian state of Tamil Nadu.

Post-graduate studies and research
In 1962 Fr. Amalorpavadass was sent by his bishop to Paris, France to the Catholic University of Paris (Institut Catholique de Paris) to pursue a degree in catechetics. In addition to completing his master's degree, he also became very proficient in French.

Continuing his stay in Paris he enrolled as a candidate at the same institute to pursue a Doctorate of Theology degree.  His doctoral dissertation was entitled Destiny of the Church in India today.

After completing his master's degree and doctorate studies he returned to India, in 1966, and was assigned a parish role in Viriyur in order to gain pastoral experience.

National Biblical, Catechetical, and Liturgical Centre
Fr. Amalorpavadass founded the National Biblical, Catechetical, and Liturgical Centre (NBCLC), Hutchins Road, Bangalore on  
6 February 1967. at the invitation of the CBCI. He was the Director from its inception in 1967 till 1982. He worked tirelessly to renew the Church in India and implement all that was envisioned by Vatican II.  This was often done through his training of bishops, priests, sisters, laity all over India and through his prodigious writing.  He was constantly in demand all over India, the world, and by the various dicastries at Vatican, as a well known Theologian, to lead, guide, speak at and participate in countless gatherings of all kind.

He initiated scholarly discussions and invited the learned scholars of India including Victor Premasagar and K. David the then members of faculty of the ecumenical Andhra Christian Theological College in Hyderabad.

Word and Worship
The liturgical journal "Word and Worship" was started during the period of Father Amalalorpavadass.

Initiatives at the University of Mysore

Chair of Christianity
The University of Mysore, the first university in Karnataka (established in 1916 by the Maharaja of Mysore, N. Krishna Wodeyar) instituted a chair in Christianity with substantial endowment from the Catholic Diocese of Mysore in 1979. Amalorpavadass was visiting professor in the chair.

Department of Christianity
Later, in 1981, a Department of Christian Studies (the first of its kind in India) was established by Amalorpavadass for promoting advanced studies and research in Christianity in the secular, multi-religious, interdisciplinary and pluralistic context of India in order to promote Christianity as an academic and scientific discipline Amalorpavadass headed the department for a while.

Anjali Ashram
While Fr. Amalorpavadass was in Mysore, he founded a Christian ashram and named it "Anjali Ashram" and served as an Acharya-Guru for thousands of seekers from all walks of life, including bishops, priests, nuns, lay people from India and abroad, till his death in 1990.

The name "Anjali" was adopted to illustrate the hospitality and love with which everyone was received in the ashram.

In the first week or according to the need of every month, the ashram offers ''Atma Purna Anubhava' (APA);– introduction to Indian Christian spirituality, and the second deeper experience 'Brahma Sakshatkara Anubhava' (BSA) for those who have participated in the first experience and keep practising their sadhana as and when required. Guruji Amalor had initiated 60 APA's and 6 BSA's during his time and now Swami Gnanajyothi(Fr.A. Louis) the present Guru continues his mission. It is now 233 APA's so far from 1984 and 7 BSA's.

Anjali ashram has a unique architectural design.  The entrance to the ashram is marked by wide open entrance without a gate(openness to all) which leads to Viswagopuram and an outer mandapa without walls meant for yoga, upadesa and dialogue meetings.  On both sides of this mandapa, there are two footpaths in a curved fashion taking you to the inner area directly.  If you walk directly through the mandapa, you pass through Swagata Nilaya – welcome abode and reach another structure(Atma Purna Nivas) used for meditations and prayer meetings.  Then comes the residences for inamates like Dasavatara cottages, Star shaped Buildings, pyramidal buildings, Om Building, Yin Yang and the 24 hermitages. There are trees Peepal tree( morning samdhya) Fig tree (Noon samdhya) and Banyan trees (for upadesas). Then comes the sanctum.  The last building is the sanctum sanctorum containing the Satcitananda Mandir within which the samadhi of the Founder is found..  The small cottages for the inmates are built on either sides of the sanctum sanctorum.  There is a footpath that takes you directly to the other gate from the sanctum sanctorum. Beyond it is found Ashtabhagya gopuram inviting everyone either to sing kirtana (praises) or be in mauna(silence). Still beyond is the Navagrahavana forest of nine planets.

Criticism
There was some resistance towards inculturation of Catholicism into the Indian context. Matthew N. Schmalz points out that some Indian Catholics resisted inculturation. A few South Indian Catholics took Amalorpavadass to court in vain, since they believed that these adaptations threatened their own distinctive identity.

Writings
Fr. D.S. Amalorpavadass had written and edited numerous volumes. A few of them are:

 Approach, Meaning, and Horizon of Evangelization, NBCLC, Bangalore, 1973
 Gospel and Culture: Evangelisation and Inculturation, NBCLC, Bangalore, 1978
 NBCLC Campus: Milieu of God-Experience.  An Artistic Synthesis of Spirituality, NBCLC, Bangalore, 1982
 Poverty of the Religious and the Religious as Poor, NBCLC, Bangalore, 1984
 Integration and Interiorization (1990)

In 1990, Gerwin van Leeuwen brought out a book entitled:
 Fully Indian – authentically Christian: A study of the first fifteen years of the NBCLC (1967–1982), Bangalore, 1990.

In 1994, Cyril de Souza sdb brought out his research entitled:"Catechesis for India Today: An Appraisal of the Catechetical Proposal of D.S. Amalorpavadass", Kristu Jyoti Publications, Bangalore.

 Two memorial volumes came out in 1991:
 J. Russel Chandran (ed.), Third World Theologies in Dialogue: Essays in Memory of D. S. Amalorpavadass, EATWOT, Bangalore, 1991.
 Paul Puthanangady ed., Church in India: Institution or Movement ? (1991)
Anjali Ashram has brought out the experience of Atma Purna Anubhava(APA) in 2000
his two doctoral thesis 'India Seeking God' and 'The destiny of the Church in India' in 2004 and Brahma Sakshatkara Anubhava (BSA) in 2004.
'An India Christian Guru' the Biography in 2011 and 2015 on the occasion of his 25th anniversary of mahasamdhi all his mission theology series have been compiled as one volume 'Mission Theology' and other writings as 'In search of Identity'. All his writings on Liturgy, Catechetics and Bible as three separate volumes Biblical Renewal, Liturgical Renewal and Catechetical Renewal. There are four books in Tamil.

Memberships
Fr. Amalorpavadass was constantly in demand and was much sought after.  He was very active in many international organizations, including

 Ecumenical Association of Third World Theologians (EATWOT),
 International Commission for English in the liturgy,
 World Catholic Federation for the Biblical Apostolate,
 International Association for Mission Studies (IAMS)
 Secretary, Biblical, Catechetical and Liturgical Commissions of the Catholic Bishop's Conference of India (CBCI).

He was appointed by Pope Paul VI as one of the two special secretaries for the Synod of Bishops on evangelisation in 1974, in the Vatican.  The outstanding contributions he made were well recognized as acknowledged above.

Death
Fr. Amalorpavadass (Amalor) died in an automobile accident on his way to Bangalore from Mysore.  He is buried at Anjali Ashram.  His final services were officiated by his older brother Simon Cardinal Lourdusamy who was then the Prefect of the Congregation for Eastern Rite Churches.

References
Notes

Further reading
 
 
 
 
 
 
 

1932 births
1990 deaths
20th-century Indian Roman Catholic priests
Institut Catholique de Paris alumni
20th-century Indian Roman Catholic theologians
People from Viluppuram district